Francis Joseph "Mickey" Blake (October 31, 1912 – June 23, 2000) was a Canadian ice hockey left winger who played ten games across three seasons in the National Hockey League for the Montreal Maroons, St. Louis Eagles and Toronto Maple Leafs. He also played several seasons in the minor leagues, in a career that lasted from 1932 to 1943. He was born in Barriefield, Ontario.

Career statistics

Regular season and playoffs

External links

1912 births
2000 deaths
Canadian ice hockey left wingers
Cleveland Barons (1937–1973) players
Detroit Olympics (IHL) players
Ice hockey people from Ontario
Montreal Maroons players
Pittsburgh Hornets players
Quebec Castors players
St. Louis Eagles players
Sportspeople from Kingston, Ontario
Syracuse Stars (IHL) players
Toronto Maple Leafs players
Windsor Bulldogs (1929–1936) players